Stephanie Feeney (also commonly performing under the name Lovely Lady Lute) is an English lutenist, documentary film maker, historical re-enactor, radio presenter for Resonance FM, committee member of the British Lute Society, comedian and brain injury campaigner.

Filmography
 Lovely Lady Lute: The Documentary (2018)

References

Year of birth missing (living people)
Living people
English classical musicians
English lutenists